Joseph Luke Wollacott (born 8 September 1996) is a professional footballer who plays as a goalkeeper for League One side Charlton Athletic. Born in England, he represents the Ghana national team.

Career
On 7 August 2019, Wollacott joined EFL League Two side Forest Green Rovers on loan for the 2019–20 season, facing competition for the first-team spot from Adam Smith and Lewis Thomas. He made his debut in professional football six days later, saving a penalty as he kept a clean sheet in a 0–0 draw with Charlton Athletic in the EFL Cup, before going on to finish on the winning side in the penalty shoot-out. On 12 February 2021, Wollacott joined League One side Swindon Town on a seven-day emergency loan deal.

In June 2021, Wollacott signed for Swindon Town on a one-year contract.

On 23 June 2022, Wollacott joined Charlton Athletic on a three-year contract following the expiry of his contract at Swindon Town.

International career
In October 2021, Wollacott received his first call-up to the Ghana national team for 2022 World Cup qualification game against Zimbabwe. He debuted with them in a 3–1 2022 FIFA World Cup qualification win over Zimbabwe on 9 October 2021. He was part of the Ghanaian team in the 2021 Africa Cup of Nations that was eliminated at the group stage of the competition.

Career statistics

International

Honours 
Individual

 EFL League Two Team of the Season: 2021–22

References

External links

1996 births
Living people
Footballers from Bristol
Citizens of Ghana through descent
Ghanaian footballers
Ghana international footballers
English footballers
English sportspeople of Ghanaian descent
Association football goalkeepers
Bristol City F.C. players
Clevedon Town F.C. players
Weymouth F.C. players
Bath City F.C. players
Woking F.C. players
Truro City F.C. players
Swindon Town F.C. players
Charlton Athletic F.C. players
Gloucester City A.F.C. players
Forest Green Rovers F.C. players
Southern Football League players
National League (English football) players
English Football League players
English expatriate footballers
Expatriate footballers in Norway
English expatriate sportspeople in Norway
Norwegian Third Division players
2021 Africa Cup of Nations players